Eucalyptus lesouefii, commonly known as goldfields blackbutt, is a species of mallet or tree that is endemic to central Western Australia. It has rough, black bark on the lower trunk, smooth bark above, lance-shaped adult leaves, flower buds in groups of seven, creamy white flowers and cup-shaped fruit.

Description
Eucalyptus lesouefii is a mallet or tree that grows to a height of  but does not form a lignotuber. The trunk is low in height, often thick, dividing to upward spreading branches that become slender and slightly spreading in habit.

Flowering occurs in August, or from October to December or from January to February and the flowers are creamy white to yellow.

Taxonomy and naming
Eucalyptus lesouefii was first formally described in 1912 by Joseph Maiden from a specimen he collected near Kalgoorlie. The description was published in his book in his A Critical Revision of the Genus Eucalyptus. The specific epithet honours  Albert Sherbourne Le Souef for his assistance to Maiden.

Distribution and habitat
The goldfields blackbutt is found on flats and slopes, in alluvial areas and elsewhere, in the Coolgardie, Great Victoria Desert and Murchison biogeographic regions centred around Kalgoorlie, Western Australia. Eucalyptus lesouefii is generally found on sandy loam, and occasionally with clays or gravel soils.

Uses
The timber, useful as firewood, is light brown and has a high density. Trees are vulnerable to white ant infestation, which occupy individuals of all ages in its native habitat and reduce its utility. A record of it commonly occurring at Widgiemooltha was noted in the 1920s.

References

Eucalypts of Western Australia
Trees of Australia
lesouefii
Myrtales of Australia
Plants described in 1912
Taxa named by Joseph Maiden